Roll the Dice may refer to:
 Roll the Dice (band), a Swedish analogue electronic music duo 
 Roll the Dice (album), an album by Damone
 "Roll the Dice" (song), a song by British singer-songwriter Steve Harley
 "Roll the Dice", a song by Dusty Trails from the album Dusty Trails
 "Roll the Dice", a song by rapper Shawty Lo
 "Roll the Dice", a song by Status Quo from the album Under the Influence
 Roll the Dice, the autobiography of Darius Guppy